Marco Gradoni is an Italian sailor. He became the first Optimist sailor in history to win three successive World Championship titles (2017, 2018 and 2019). In doing so, Gradoni was awarded the Rolex World Sailor of The Year Award in 2019, being the youngest ever recipient.

Gradoni currently sails in the mixed 470 class as a skipper.

He won the 470 mixed world junior championship 2021 in Sanremo.

References

External links
 

Living people
2000s births
Italian male sailors (sport)
Optimist class world champions
21st-century Italian people